The Russian-language surname Toporov (feminine: Toporova) is derived from the word topor, "axe". The surname may refer to:

Vladimir Toporov, Russian philologist
Sergei Toporov, Russian football player and coach

See also
Topor (surname)

Russian-language surnames